Ferdinand Prénom (born 11 January 1991) is a French professional basketball player, who last played for Chorale Roanne Basket of LNB Pro A.

Playing career
On 6 May 2014 he was part of the list of sixteen pre-selected players for the France A 'team to tour China and Italy during the month of June.

In May 2015, he signed a one-year contract with Boulogne, a French club relegated to Pro B. In February 2020, he suffered a season ending knee injury.

References

External links
LNB Profile

1991 births
Living people
Centers (basketball)
Chorale Roanne Basket players
French men's basketball players
HTV Basket players
JDA Dijon Basket players
Olympique Antibes basketball players
Orléans Loiret Basket players
SOMB Boulogne-sur-Mer players
Basketball players from Paris